Domenico Mario Assunto Dolce (born 13 August 1958) is an Italian fashion designer and entrepreneur. Along with Stefano Gabbana, he is one half of the luxury fashion house Dolce & Gabbana (D&G). Since founding D&G in 1985, Dolce has become one of the world's most influential fashion designers and an industry icon.

Early life and education
Dolce was born in Polizzi Generosa, Sicily, in 1958. His father was a tailor and his mother sold fabrics and apparel. He moved to Milan to attend the fashion design school Istituto Marangoni, but he dropped out before graduating, confident he knew enough to work in the industry. His dream was to work for Armani.

Career

In 1980, Dolce met Stefano Gabbana through Dolce's employer, designer Giorgio Correggiari. In 1983, Gabbana and Dolce left Correggiari to work on their own; two years later, they launched Dolce & Gabbana S.p.A. (D&G).

In October 1985, the Dolce & Gabbana brand made its fashion show debut at Milano Collezioni's Nuovi Talenti (New Talents). In March 1986, D&G released its first collection and held its own show, "Real Women." In 1987, the first D&G store opened in Milan, at 7 Via Santa Cecilia. In 1988, D&G established a partnership with Dolce's father, Saverio, who owned the manufacturing company Dolce Saverio in Legnano, near Milan.

D&G continued to expand, holding its first fashion shows in Tokyo (April 1989) and New York (April 1990), and releasing new collection lines, including its first lingerie and beachwear line in July 1989, and its first menswear line in January 1990. In November 1990, D&G opened its New York City showroom at 532 Broadway in SoHo, Manhattan. D&G released its first fragrance, Dolce & Gabbana Parfum, in October 1992.

In 1993, the Italian designers received worldwide fame when Madonna chose D&G to design the costumes for her Girlie Show World Tour. They have since gone on to design for Monica Bellucci, Kylie Minogue, Angelina Jolie and Isabella Rossellini.

Later additions to the D&G line included ties, belts, handbags, sunglasses, watches and footwear. By 2003, the company sold more products in Italy than Armani, Gucci, Prada, and Versace. In 2009, nearly 25 years after D&G opened, the company had 113 stores and 21 factory outlets, a staff of 3,500 people and an annual turnover of more than €1 billion.

Personal life

Dolce and Gabbana were an open couple for many years. The couple made its coming out in 1999. Following their success, they lived in a 19th-century villa in Milan, and owned several properties on the French Riviera. They also own a villa in Portofino. They ended their long-time relationship in 2003, but the pair still work together at D&G.

As of October 2015, Dolce was the 27th richest person in Italy with a net worth of approximately US$1.74 billion, according to Forbes.

Controversies 
In 2013, both Domenico Dolce and Stefano Gabbana were convicted of tax evasion and sentenced to a 20-month suspended sentence in prison.  An Italian court found the pair guilty of failing to declare millions of euros of revenue earned through a D&G subsidiary company, Gado, based in Luxembourg. They denied the charges and appealed the case; in October 2014, they were both cleared of wrongdoing by the appellate court.

In March 2015, Dolce's comments about in vitro fertilization (IVF) sparked a social media storm of criticism. In an interview with Panorama magazine, Dolce said, "I am gay. I cannot have a child. I believe you cannot have everything in life.... You are born from a father and a mother. Or at least that is how it should be. For this reason I am not convinced by what I call children of chemistry, or synthetic children. Uteruses for rent, sperm chosen from a catalogue." British singer-songwriter Elton John, who has children by IVF with his husband David Furnish, called for a boycott of the D&G brand. This sparked a war of words, with Gabbana later calling John a "fascist" and calling for a counter-boycott. He ended up apologizing for his remark.

In 2018, along with Stefano Gabbana, he issued a video apology after their brand published promo videos of their upcoming fashion show in China that were deemed racist, along with hacked private messages that were insulting towards the Chinese people, which had sparked a wave of boycotts.

Honours

Gabbana and Dolce have received numerous honours for their fashion and cultural contributions. Their first fashion award, the International Woolmark Prize, came in 1991. In 1993, their Dolce & Gabbana Parfum was named the Best Fragrance of the Year.

In 2009, the City of Milan awarded them the Ambrogino Gold medal; in 2014, they announced intentions to return it after a city council member called them tax evaders.
In 2014, the La Fondazione NY, a charity aimed at supporting young Italian and American artists, honoured Gabbana, Dolce and film director Baz Luhrmann at its third awards gala at the Museum of the Moving Image in New York City.  "We live with movies – our inspiration all the time is movies and we make our collection like a movie," Gabbana said during the event.

References

External links
 

1958 births
Living people
Italian fashion designers
Italian gay artists
LGBT fashion designers
Italian LGBT businesspeople
Dolce & Gabbana
Gay businessmen
People from Polizzi Generosa
Italian billionaires
20th-century Italian LGBT people
21st-century Italian LGBT people